Schinus weinmanniifolia, the Uruguyan pepper tree, is a native tree of Uruguay, northwest Argentina, Paraguay, and southern Brazil. It grows to 3 to 9 metres in height with a crown width of 3 to 5 metres.

References

weinmanniifolia
Trees of Uruguay
Trees of Brazil
Trees of Argentina